'Reclaim' is Keep of Kalessin's first EP. It was released on December 6, 2003 in the United States and in Europe on January 15, 2004 as a Mini CD. It was recorded in July, 2003 in Silverstone Studios and Schweinhund Studios. The EP was produced by Schwein and Obsidian C. The EP was mixed by Schwein and mastered by Masterhuset. The cover design was done by MultiMono, by Asgeir Mickelson

Frost (Satyricon) heard the new Keep of Kalessin material and immediately said yes when Obsidian C. asked him to do the drumming on this new EP. Touring with Satyricon also made it possible for Obsidian C. to recruit the legendary Attila Csihar for the vocals on Reclaim who is well known for the vocals on Mayhem´s De Mysteriis Dom Sathanas. The three piece line-up recorded the EP which put the band into the Elite black metal scene of Norway, but due to the distance between Frost, Attila and Obsidian C., this line-up was short-lived.

Attila did all the vocals on this release. However, Obsidian C. performed additional vocals on Come Damnation and Reclaim. Obsidian C. is also responsible for writing the music, except for IX which was written by Obsidian C. and S. Groenbech. Traveler was written, but also performed by S. Groenbech alone. The lyrics were written by Torstein Parelius, courtesy of Chton and Manes. The lyrics of Reclaim were written by Obsidian C. and he was also responsible for the lyrical arrangements, together with Attila.

Track listing

Notes
  The song Obliterator was originally released on Through times of war. This version was specially re-recorded for this release.

Personnel
 Arnt "Obsidian C." Ove Grønbech  - guitars, bass, synths, lyrics
 Kjetil-Vidar "Frost" Haraldstad - drums
 Attila Csihar - vocals
 Torstein Parelius - lyrics

External links
 Encyclopaedia Metallum
 Keep of Kalessin at MySpace

2003 EPs